The Colossus of Rhodes was a statue of the Greek Titan Helios, erected in the city of Rhodes between 292 and 280 BC.

Colossus of Rhodes may also refer to:
The Colossus of Rhodes (Dalí), 1954 painting by Salvador Dalí
The Colossus of Rhodes (film), 1961 Italian film
The Colossus of Rhodes (novel), 2005 novel by Caroline Lawrence
Colossus Rhodes BC, or Kolossos Rodou B.C., Greek professional basketball team

See also
The Rhodes Colossus, 1892 cartoon of the Scramble for Africa period